1138 Attica, provisional designation , is an asteroid from the outer region of the asteroid belt, approximately 24 kilometers in diameter. It was discovered on 22 November 1929, by German astronomer Karl Reinmuth at Heidelberg Observatory in southwest Germany. It was named after the Attica Province in Greece.

Orbit and classification 

Attica orbits the Sun in the outer main-belt at a distance of 2.9–3.4 AU once every 5 years and 7 months (2,037 days). Its orbit has an eccentricity of 0.07 and an inclination of 14° with respect to the ecliptic. The body's observation arc begins at Heidelberg with its official discovery observation. No precoveries were taken, and no prior identifications were made.

Physical characteristics 

According to the survey carried out by NASA's Wide-field Infrared Survey Explorer with its subsequent NEOWISE mission, Attica measures 23.681 kilometers in diameter and its surface has an albedo of 0.105. Based on a generic magnitude-to-diameter conversion, its diameter is between 13 and 32 kilometer for an absolute magnitude of 11.4 and an assumed albedo in the range of 0.05 to 0.25. Since asteroids in the outer main-belt are typically of carbonaceous rather than stony composition, with averaged standard albedos of 0.057, Atticas diameter can be estimated to measure close to 30 kilometers, as the lower a body's albedo (reflectivity), the larger its diameter at a fixed absolute magnitude (brightness).

As of 2017, Atticas spectral type, as well as its rotation period and shape remain unknown. This is rather unusual, as both spectral type and rotation period have been determined for most larger and low-numbered asteroids (also see minor-planet lists from 1 up to 2000).

Naming 

This minor planet is named after the province of Attica in eastern Greece with the capital Athens. Naming citation was first mentioned in The Names of the Minor Planets by Paul Herget in 1955.

References

External links 
 Asteroid Lightcurve Database (LCDB), query form (info )
 Dictionary of Minor Planet Names, Google books
 Asteroids and comets rotation curves, CdR – Observatoire de Genève, Raoul Behrend
 Discovery Circumstances: Numbered Minor Planets (1)-(5000) – Minor Planet Center
 
 

001138
Discoveries by Karl Wilhelm Reinmuth
Named minor planets
19291122